The following schools have the name Landesgymnasium:

 Landesgymnasium für Hochbegabte Schwäbisch Gmünd, Baden-Württemberg
 Landesgymnasium für Musik Wernigerode, Saxony-Anhalt
 Sächsisches Landesgymnasium für Musik Carl Maria von Weber, Dresden, Saxony
 Sächsisches Landesgymnasium Sankt Afra zu Meißen, Saxony